Adamu is a surname or given name.

Mononym
Adamu (Assyrian king) (lived c. 2400 BC — c. 2300 BC), an Assyrian king

Given name
Adamu Sidi Ali (born 1952), Nigerian politician and farmer
Adamu Aliero (born 1957), Nigerian politician, governor of Kebbi State in Nigeria (1999-2007)
Adamu Atta (1927–2014), Nigerian politician, first civilian governor of the Nigerian Kwara State 
Adamu Bello (born 1951), Nigerian politician
Adamu Ciroma (1934–2018), Nigerian politician and Governor of the Central Bank of Nigeria
Adamu Daramani Sakande (1962–2020), Ghanaian politician and a member of Parliament 
Adamu Gumba (born 1948), Nigerian politician and Senator
Adamu Maikori (1942–2020), Nigerian lawyer, banker and politician
Adamu Mohammed (born 1983), Ghanaian footballer
Adamu Garba Talba (born 1952), Nigerian politician and Senator
Adamu Tesfaw (born 1922), also called Qes Adamu Tesfaw, an Ethiopian artist and former priest
Adamu Wayya or Dan Maraya or Adamu Danmaraya Jos (1946–2015), Nigerian Hausa griot best known for playing the kontigi
Adamu Waziri (born 1952), Nigerian police officer, Nigerian minister of Police Affairs

Middle name
Abubakar Adamu Mohamed (born 1997), Nigerian footballer 
Abubakar Adamu Rasheed, Nigerian academician, administrator, Professor of English
Abubakar Adamu Mohamed (born 1997), Nigerian footballer
Amina Adamu Aliyu, Nigerian judge 
Baba Adamu Iyam, Nigerian military officer who served as Military Administrator
Gagdi Adamu Yusuf (born 1980), Nigerian politician and Member of Nigerian Federal House of Representatives
Gibril Adamu Mohammed, Ghanaian politician
Mohammed Adamu Bello (born 1957), Nigerian politician, businessman and Senator
Mohammed Adamu Ramadan (born 1975), Ghanaian politician
Mustapha Adamu Animashaun (1885–1968), prominent Lagos Islamic leader 
Shuaibu Adamu Ahmed, Nigerian politician and minister
Suleiman Adamu Kazaure, Nigerian politician and minister
Suleman Adamu Sanid (born 1970), Ghanaian politician and Member of Parliament
Zainab Adamu Bulkachuwa (born 1950), Nigerian Judge and President of the Nigerian courts of appeal Justice

Surname
Abdalla Uba Adamu (born 1956), Nigerian academic, educator, publisher and media scholar
Abdullahi Adamu (born 1945), Nigerian politician
Abdulahi Bala Adamu, Nigerian politician and Senator 
Abu Kasim Adamu, Nigerian botanist and professor of science
Adamu Adamu (born 1954), Nigerian accountant, journalist, minister 
Ahmed Adamu, Nigerian petroleum economist and lecturer
Amos Adamu, Nigerian administrator, Director General of the Nigerian National Sports Commission
Baba Adamu (born 1979), known occasionally simply by his nickname Armando, Ghanaian footballer
Birtukan Adamu Ali (born 1992), Ethiopian runner
Charles Adamu (born 1977), Ghanaian boxer
Junior Adamu (born 2001), Nigerian-born Austrian footballer
Edward Lametek Adamu, Nigerian quantity surveyor, business consultant and leadership strategist
Fatima Adamu (born 1972), Nigerian entrepreneur and philanthropist
Ibrahim Adamu (born 1981), Nigerian badminton player
Mamudu Adamu (born 1960), Nigerian judoka
Mohammed Adamu (disambiguation), a number of people with the name
Mohammed Adamu (born 1961), Nigerian police officer, formerly a Nigerian inspector-general of police
Semira Adamu (born 1978), Nigerian refugee who was suffocated to death with a pillow, by two Belgian police officers during her expulsion
Suleiman Adamu (1963-2020), Nigerian politician. Member of the Nasarawa State House of Assembly
Yahaya Adamu (born 1993), Nigerian footballer
Yakubu Adamu (born 1981), Nigerian footballer

See also
Adamus (disambiguation)
Adămuș, a commune in Mureș County, Transylvania, Romania
Adamu Tafawa Balewa College of Education, Nigeria
Hussaini Adamu Federal Polytechnic (HAFEDPOLY), polytechnic located in Kazaure, Jigawa State, Nigeria